David "Dangerous" Dellow (born 21 April 1979 in Brisbane) is an Australian triathlete. He is best known for his wins at Noosa Triathlon 2011 and Cairns Ironman.

Early life 
Son to David and Cheryl who both competed in triathlon events, David caught the triathlon bug early on life and competed in his first triathlon when he was only 12 years of age.

One of a few esteemed triathletes to go Sub-8 hours for an Ironman Triathlon (in Challenge Roth 2015), David rose to be a star in shorter Sprint and Olympic distance triathlons before finding his niche in long course and Ironman events.

Sponsorships 
 Cervelo
 McDonald's
 Rotor
 Zipp
 Cannibal
 Rudy Project
 Hoka

Results

2008 

Geelong 70.3 - 3rd

Gold Coast Half Ironman Winner

2009 

Geelong 70.3 - 2nd

2011 

Noosa Triathlon Olympic Distance

2012  

Cairns Ironman
3rd - Embrunmann

Ironman World Championship

2013  

3rd - Philippines 70.3

3rd - Busselton Ironman

2014 

Hervey Bay 100 Winner

2016 

Port Macquarie Ironman - 2nd 

Cairns Ironman - 2nd  - David Dellow 8:19:13

Media

Links

References

Australian male triathletes
1979 births
Living people
20th-century Australian people
21st-century Australian people